Running Turtle is a 2009 South Korean film about a countryside detective trying to capture a legendary prison breaker. Released on June 11, 2009, it was directed by Lee Yeon-woo and starred Kim Yoon-seok and Jung Kyung-ho.

Plot 
Jo Pil-seong is an idle detective who spends his time scratching off lottery tickets in his office, while his wife and children work in a manhwa shop. Gomi is declared as a winner, and Pil-seong's friends celebrate their victory later that night as they wait for him to arrive.

Meanwhile, an escaped prisoner named Song Gi-tae intervenes in the celebration and steals Pil-seong's money. When Pil-seong finds out what has happened he confronts the criminal, but suffers a humiliating defeat.

Pil-seong reports to his colleagues and his boss that he encountered the infamous Gi-tae, but none of them believed in him. In an attempt to recapture Gi-tae, Pil-seong decides to recruit his friends (who were beaten up by Gi-tae earlier) and found him inside a house with his girlfriend, Kyeong-joo. Formulating a plan, Pil-seong tells his friends to stand by the outside window of where Gi-tae was, while Pil-seong himself sneaks into the house, armed with pepper spray. Gi-tae, however, was aware of Pil-seong's presence and once escaped before the police arrived. Before leaving, Gi-tae takes out his knife, stabs Pil-seong's right hand, and warns him that the next time he'll kill him if he tries to capture him again.

Suffering from public humiliation as well as being kicked out of the house by his wife (because of her money), Pil-seong decides to train himself in fighting Gi-tae. When taking taekwondo lessons one day, Pil-seong learns that the upper part of the human rib cage is the vulnerable area of taking his opponents down. He later buys himself his own handgun as his own personal defense weapon.

In the next encounter of Gi-tae, Pil-seong got him surrounded by keeping Kyeong-joo hostage. As he forced Gi-tae to keep moving on, Pil-seong's friends intervened, causing Gi-tae to escape once again. Pil-seong's friends begged him to give up capturing Gi-tae for his own sake, but he refuses.

Meanwhile, one of Gi-tae's accomplice, Pyo Jae-seok, was arrested by Pil-seong. He confiscates Jae-seok's handphone and orders him to bring back the money that Gi-tae stole from him. Learning that Gi-tae was hiding somewhere in a fishing village, Pil-seong uses a bullhorn and asks Gi-tae to reveal himself.

Realizing that Pil-seong has the money and Jaeseok's cell phone, Gi-tae calls him and tells him that he is next to the manhwa shop where his family works. Holding a gasoline tank, he gives Pil-seong one hour to meet him and bring the money, or else he'll destroy the manhwa shop with his family inside.

Pil-seong did as he was told but also asked his colleagues and policemen to arrive in his family's manhwa shop. Pil-seong arrived in a small fenced area and buried the money, before Gi-tae came. Wanting to capture Gi-tae, he non-fatally shoots him in the stomach with his handgun. He discards his handgun and takes Gi-tae's knife and asks for a fair fight. The battle then ensures as both Pil-seong and Gi-tae beat each other up to the pulp.

Finally cornering Pil-seong, Gi-tae asks him for the money and threatens to kill him if he doesn't. Gi-tae finds the money and walks off. However, Pil-seong regained consciousness and eventually defeats his opponent by accurately striking him in the upper rib cage. Pil-seong is barely conscious from the fight, but is satisfied on his efforts of capturing Gi-tae. Pil-seong's colleagues later finds him in the cell sleeping with Gi-tae handcuffed.

Few days later, Pil-seong and his colleagues was awarded for a higher position as officers and led a ceremonial parade to Pil-seong's daughter's school. The film ends as Pil-seong and the fellow officers gave a salute.

Cast 
 Kim Yoon-seok ... Jo Pil-seong
 Jung Kyung-ho ... Song Gi-tae
 Kyeon Mi-ri ... Detective Jo's wife
 Sunwoo Sun ... Kyeong-joo, Gi-tae's girlfriend
 Kim Ji-na ... Ok-soon
 Shin Jung-geun ... Yong-bae
 Choi Kwon ... Pyo Jae-seok
 Kim Hye-ji ... Joo-rang
 Joo Jin-mo ... Team leader Yang
 Lee Moo-saeng ... Detective Lee

Release and box office 
Running Turtle opened in South Korea on June 11, 2009 and topped the box office over its first weekend with a total of 480,293 admissions. It led the box office for a second consecutive weekend, and as of August 2 had accumulated a total of 3,051,136 admissions and grossed .

References

External links 
  
 
 
 

2009 films
2000s Korean-language films
2000s crime action films
2000s action comedy films
South Korean detective films
South Korean action comedy films
South Korean crime action films
South Korean martial arts films
Showbox films
2009 martial arts films
2009 comedy films
2000s South Korean films